Sir George Victor Lansell  (3 October 1883 – 9 January 1959) was an English-born Australian politician.

He was born in London to mining entrepreneur George Lansell and Harriet Edith Bassford. He was educated in Bendigo and at Melbourne Grammar School, and in 1906 inherited his father's estate of £6 million. He owned the Bendigo Independent newspaper and merged it with the Bendigo Advertiser in 1918, and was chairman of a large number of media and other companies around regional Victoria. During World War I he served in the AIF with the 38th Battalion, becoming a captain but being wounded on the Western Front. In 1923 he was awarded the Volunteer Decoration and promoted to commanding officer of his battalion; he was raised to the rank of lieutenant-colonel in 1927 and appointed a Companion of the Order of St Michael and St George in 1937. In 1928 he had won election to the Victorian Legislative Council as a Nationalist member for Bendigo Province. In 1944 he defected to the Country Party, but he joined the Liberal and Country Party in 1949; he remained sympathetic to the Country Party government of John McDonald. Lansell was knighted in 1951, but lost his seat in the Council the following year. He died in Bendigo in 1959.

References

1883 births
1959 deaths
20th-century Australian politicians
Australian Companions of the Order of St Michael and St George
Australian Knights Bachelor
Liberal Party of Australia members of the Parliament of Victoria
Members of the Victorian Legislative Council
National Party of Australia members of the Parliament of Victoria
Nationalist Party of Australia members of the Parliament of Victoria
United Australia Party members of the Parliament of Victoria
British emigrants to Australia